The 36th Cairo International Film Festival was held from November 9–18, 2014, including 17 films from ten Arab countries. Six films featured were nominated for the 87th Academy Awards the following year. The jury included four male and four female filmmakers representing the Middle East, Asia, Africa, and Europe as well as the disciplines of direction, screenwriting, production, cinematography, and criticism, headed by Egyptian actress Yousra.

Background
Festival management chose Yousra as the first Egyptian jury chair in the history of the Festival. animated and a documentary films also made their first appearances with one of each. Another unprecedented move was hiring an Egyptian designer, Karim Adam, to design the official poster, featuring local actress Nadia Lutfi.

Lutfi received a special Lifetime Achievement Award during the opening ceremony, and the Festival prepared a documentary on her career that was shown on the second day. The first submissions in Festival history opened from the United Arab Emirates (Ali F. Mostafa’s From A to B) and Iran (Abed Abest’s The Corner).

Egyptian films featured
Six Egyptian films were featured at the Festival. The International Features category included Karim Hanafi’s Bab Al-Wadaa (“The Farewell Gate”), starring Salwa Khattab and Ahmed Magdy. The Short Film category featured Ahmed Abdalla’s Décor, starring Kal Naga and Horeya Farghaly, along with Mouhamed Rady’s Wall of Heroism. The Classics category showed a restored version of Henry Barakat’s 1965 film The Sin in honor of what would have been his 100th birthday. Finally, the late director and singer-actor Hussein al-Imam’s black-and-white film Like a Matchstick was screened.

Juries

International Competition
 Yousra, Egyptian actress (Chair)
 Wang Xiaoshuai, Chinese director, whose Red Amnesia was screened here and at the 71st Venice International Film Festival the same year
 Haile Gerima, Ethiopian director
 Corinne van Egeraat, Dutch actress-writer-producer
 Ibrahim Al-Ariss, Lebanese critic
 Alexis Grivas, Greek cinematographer
 Dominique Cabrera, French director
 Mariam Naoum, Egyptian screenwriter
 Nancy Abdel-Fattah, Egyptian cinematographer

International Critics’ Week
 Laila Elwi, Egyptian actress (Chair)
 Mohamed Reda, Lebanese critic
 Najib Ayyad, Tunisian producer

Horizons of Arab Cinema
 Khamis Al-Khayati, Tunisian critic (Chair)
 Deborah Young, American critic
 Barbara Löwe, German critic

Films

International

International Critics’ Week

Awards

International Competition
 Golden Pyramid Award: Melbourne, Nima Javidi
 Silver Pyramid for Best Director: Forever, Margarita Manda
 Silver Pyramid for Best Screenplay, Boy and the World, Alê Abreu
 Silver Pyramid for Best Artistic Contribution: Bab Al-Wadaa, cinematographer Zaki Aref
 Best Actor: Eyes of a Thief, Kal Naga
 Best Actress: Love at First Fight, Adele Hamlin

International Critics’ Week
The following were unanimously announced:
 Shadi Abdeslam Prize: No One's Child, Vuk Ršumović
 Fathi Farag Award for Best Artistic Contribution: Brides, Tinatin Kajrishvili

Prospects of Arab Movies
 Saad Eddine Wahba Prize (Best Artistic Contribution): Sotto Voce, Kamal Kamal (Morocco)
 Youssef Chahine Award (Best Artistic Creativity): Bab Al-Wadaa, Zaki Aref
 Salah Abu Seif Award (Best Arabic Film): Scheherazade's Diary, Zeina Daccache (Lebanon)
 Special Certificate of Appreciation: Theeb
 Naguib Mahfouz Awards (Golden Pyramid of Honor):
 Volker Schlöndorff, German director
 Noureddine Saïl, Egyptian cinematographer
 Nadia Lutfi, Egyptian actress

External links
 IMDb page

References	

Cairo International Film Festival
2014 film festivals